Possum may refer to:

Animals
 Phalangeriformes, or possums, any of a number of arboreal marsupial species native to Australia, New Guinea, and Sulawesi
 Common brushtail possum (Trichosurus vulpecula), a common possum in Australian urban areas, invasive in New Zealand
 Common ringtail possum (Pseudocheirus peregrinus), also common in Australian urban areas, absent from New Zealand
 Phalangeridae (possums and cuscuses), a family of marsupials native to Australia and New Guinea containing most of the species referred to as "possums" in Australia
 Opossum, or possum, an order (Didelphimorphia) of marsupials native to the Americas
 Common opossum, native to Central and South America
 Virginia opossum, native to North America

People with the name
 Possum Bourne (1956–2003), New Zealand rally car driver
 George Jones (1931–2013), known as "The Possum", American country music singer
 Possum Jones (1934-1997), American NASCAR driver
 Clifford Possum Tjapaltjarri (1932–2002), Indigenous Australian painter
 Possum Whitted (1890–1962), American baseball player

Arts and entertainment

Film and television
 Possum (film), a 2018 British psychological horror film
 Possums (film), a 1998 sports comedy film
 "The Possum", an episode of Parks and Recreation

Music
 "Possum", a 1987 song written by Jeff Holdsworth on Trey Anastasio's 1987 album The Man Who Stepped into Yesterday
 "Possum", a 1989 song by feedtime from Suction
 "Possum", a 1995 song by Juned
 "The Possum", a 2015 song by Sun Kil Moon from Universal Themes

See also
Opossum (disambiguation)

Animal common name disambiguation pages